Margaret Pollock McPhun (1876–1960) was a Scottish suffragette from Glasgow who served two months in Holloway Prison in London and composed a poem about imprisoned activist Janie Allan.

Life
McPhun was born on 8 July 1876. Her father was a Glasgow councillor and timber merchant. She and her sister Frances McPhun joined the Women's Social and Political Union (WSPU) in 1909, and she was the Scottish WSPU press secretary from 1912-1914. They were amongst dozens jailed for smashing government office windows in March 1912. The sisters had both attended the University of Glasgow, where Margaret had studied psychology and obtained an MA in 1897. 

The sisters used the name "Campbell" to hide their background when they were arrested. When they were released from Holloway Prison after two months, they were given hunger strike medals 'for Valour' by the WSPU to record their hunger strikes, though the sisters had agreed that they would choose to drink from a cup to avoid being force fed through a nasal tube.

Margaret composed a poem about a fellow prisoner named Janie Allan who enjoyed popular support in Scotland. The poem was titled "To A Fellow Prisoner (Miss Janie Allan)", and it was included in the anthology Holloway Jingles published by the Glasgow branch of the WSPU later that year.

References

Bibliography

Elizabeth Crawford, The Women's Suffrage Movement: A Reference Guide 1866-1928, 1998 

1876 births
1960 deaths
Scottish suffragettes
Politicians from Glasgow
20th-century Scottish women politicians
20th-century Scottish politicians
Alumni of the University of Glasgow
Women's Social and Political Union
Hunger Strike Medal recipients
Date of death missing